Thomas Jefferson University Hospital is the flagship hospital of Jefferson Health, a multi-state non-profit health system based in Philadelphia. The hospital serves as the teaching hospital for Thomas Jefferson University.

History
Originally formed in 1825 as the Infirmary of the Jefferson Medical College, the predecessor of the Hospital of Jefferson Medical College, Thomas Jefferson University Hospital serves patients in Philadelphia and the surrounding communities in the Delaware Valley and southern New Jersey.

Thomas Jefferson University Hospitals system has 957 licensed acute care beds. Services are provided at five locations — the main hospital facility and Jefferson Hospital for Neuroscience, both in Center City Philadelphia; Methodist Hospital in South Philadelphia; Jefferson at the Navy Yard, just past the sports complex; and Jefferson-Voorhees in South Jersey.

Awards and recognition
In 2017–2018, U.S. News & World Report ranked Thomas Jefferson University Hospital as the 16th best hospital in the country. Jefferson was nationally ranked in 11 specialties including 2nd best in ophthalmology, 4th best in orthopedics, 8th best in ear, nose & throat, 17th best in gastroenterology and GI surgery, 20th best in cancer, 21st best in neurology and neurosurgery, 26th best in diabetes and endocrinology, 27th best in urology, 38th best in geriatrics, 41st best in cardiology and heart surgery, and 48th best in nephrology.
In 2013–2014, U.S. News & World Report ranked Jefferson University Hospital as the 17th Best Hospital in the country. In addition, Jefferson was ranked as the 7th best hospital in the nation for orthopedics, 14th best for pulmonology, 16th best for rehabilitation, 17th best for cancer, 18th best for diabetes & endocrinology, 19th best for ear, nose & throat and 20th best for urology. U.S. News also named Jefferson as among the best within the Philadelphia region in five other specialties: Gastroenterology & GI Surgery, Geriatrics, Gynecology, Nephrology, Neurology & Neurosurgery.
 In 2009, Jefferson University Hospital was granted MAGNET recognition for nursing excellence from the American Nurses Credentialing Center's (ANCC). In 2018, Jefferson was recognized for the third time with this honor.
 In 2013, Philadelphia magazine named 75 Jefferson physicians to their annual "top docs" list.

Medical milestones and innovations
 In 1826, Franklin Bache, a professor of chemistry at Thomas Jefferson University, became the first researcher in the United States to conduct organized studies using acupuncture therapy.
 In 1881, William Thomson invented a standard test for color blindness.
Jacob da Silva Solis-Cohen performed the first successful laryngotomy for vocal cord cancer in 1868. A laryngotomy is a procedure that involves cutting into the larynx in order to assist respiration when the upper part of the airway has been restricted.
 Frank H. Krusen is regarded as the “father” of the physical medicine and rehabilitation field – a branch of medicine that aims to restore functional ability and quality of life to those with physical deficiencies or disabilities.
 John H. Gibbon Jr. conceived and developed the world's first successful heart-lung machine in 1953. The heart-lung machine is a device that temporarily takes over the function of the heart and lungs during surgery. He also performed multiple open heart surgeries which revolutionized heart surgery in the twentieth century.
 George J. Haupt invented the Jefferson Ventilator in 1957 while a resident at Thomas Jefferson University Hospital. Dr. Haupt developed and patented the mechanical ventilator used during surgeries to inflate the patient's lungs and discharge carbon dioxide accumulated in the blood because the patient could not exhale.
 In 1965, Barry B. Goldberg, a professor of radiology at Jefferson Medical College, was deemed a pioneer in ultrasound technology. Ultrasound imaging is a technique that enables the viewing of several body structures including tendons, muscles, joints, and internal organs.
 In 1972, Norman Lasker, a professor of medicine at Jefferson Medical College, invented the Jefferson Cycler—the first at-home self-treatment device for kidney dialysis patients. Dialysis is the process of removing waste and excess water from the blood and is used as an artificial replacement for lost kidney function.
 Charles Klieman developed the modern surgical stapler in 1982, as well as the first articulating laparoscopic instrument in 1986. These are scissors that allow surgeons to choose an extremely precise angle of cut.
 On March 19, 2007, Drs. Scott Silvestry and Linda Bogar were the first in Pennsylvania to implant the Jarvik 2000® Heart Assist System to save the life of a cardiac patient.

Notable births, hospitalizations, and deaths

Hospitalizations
Michael Irvin, 1999
Darren Daulton, 2013

Deaths
Edward Walter Clark Jr., April 4, 1946
George Franklin Pawling, December 2, 1954

References

External links
 

Hospitals in Philadelphia
Market East, Philadelphia
Teaching hospitals in Pennsylvania
Trauma centers